Captured is the seventh studio album by American alternative rock band Caroline's Spine. It was the first album to feature entirely new material since 1999's Attention Please.

Track listing
 "Pieces" - 2:51
 "Instrument of Change" - 3:56
 "Show Me" - 4:05
 "Answer" - 5:40
 "Unreal" - 6:08
 "Cannot Be Captured" - 3:09
 "Bang" - 3:27
 "Wasted" - 3:58
 "Anxious" - 3:53
 "Lost" - 2:55
 "Believer of Me" - 3:54
 "Last Goodbye" - 5:29
 "?" - 3:42

Band Lineup
Jimmy Newquist - vocals, guitar
Mark Haugh - guitar, backing vocals
Scott Jones - bass, backing vocals
Jason Gilardi - drums

References 

2007 albums
Caroline's Spine albums